Wanda Hutson (born January 8, 1985) is a track and field sprint athlete who competes internationally for Trinidad and Tobago.

Wanda attended Port of Spain's Bishop Anstey High School (2001) in Trinidad. She went on to Southern Union State Community College in Auburn, Alabama, and eventually graduated from Abilene Christian University, where she met her husband, Chris Woods, in 2010, with a first degree in Information Systems. Wanda was a two-time NCAA Division II All American for the ACU Wildcats in 2010.

Her best time of 11.38 (1.3) in the 100m dash is a Trinidad & Tobago National Junior Record. Her best time in the 200m is 23.65. Both performances came at the 2004 National Championships in Port-of-Spain. That year, she also won the Central American and Caribbean Junior Championships women's 100m title with a time of 11.46, and was fourth in the finals of the women's 100m at the IAAF World Junior Championships in Grosseto, Italy, running 11.45. She had been eighth (11.87) at the 2002 World Junior Championships in Kingston, Jamaica.

Wanda competed at the 2004 Summer Olympics in Athens, Greece, as a member of her country's sprint relay team, which failed to complete its race in the opening round. She again represented Trinidad and Tobago at the 2008 Summer Olympics in Beijing. She competed at the 4x100 metres relay together with Kelly-Ann Baptiste, Ayanna Hutchinson and Semoy Hackett. In their first round heat they did not finish and were eliminated due to a mistake with the baton exchange.

Wanda is 5'4" (163 cm) and weighs 104 lbs (47 kg).

References

External links

1985 births
Living people
Trinidad and Tobago female sprinters
Olympic athletes of Trinidad and Tobago
Athletes (track and field) at the 2004 Summer Olympics
Athletes (track and field) at the 2008 Summer Olympics
Olympic female sprinters